On with the Dance is 1920 American silent costume drama directed by George Fitzmaurice, starring Mae Murray and David Powell, and released by Paramount Pictures.  The film is a screen adaptation of the 1917 Michael Morton play by the same name.

Filming began in August 1919 when Mae Murray rejoined Famous Players-Lasky Corporation after having completed a term with Universal Pictures.

Actor Robert Schable had appeared in the 1917 Broadway play.

Cast
 Mae Murray as Sonia
 David Powell as Peter Derwynt
 Alma Tell as Lady Tremelyn
 John Miltern as Schuyler Van Vechten
 Robert Schable as Jimmy Sutherland
 Ida Waterman as Countess of Raystone
 Zolya Talma as Fay Desmond
 James A. Furey 
 Peter Raymond

Preservation status
The film is preserved at George Eastman House(w/Italian titles) and an excerpt appears in a Paramount promotional.

Reception
The Evening Post wrote that Mae Murray's work with David Powell was a "revelation", and that her dance work in the film was one of its "outstanding features".  Toronto Star noted the film as a success and wrote than fans of Mae Murray and David Powell will hail the two stars returning to headline George Fitzmaurice next film The Right to Love.   The Milwaukee Journal wrote that the film played Mae Murray's "dainty little figure and delightful dancing" to advantage.

In popular culture
An excerpt of the film is seen in the Paramount promotional film The House That Shadows Built (1931).

References

External links

 
 Frame of opening title sequence of On With the Dance
 alternate lobby poster

1920 films
1920 drama films
Silent American drama films
American silent feature films
American black-and-white films
Famous Players-Lasky films
American films based on plays
Films directed by George Fitzmaurice
Films with screenplays by Ouida Bergère
1920s American films